SFZ is a plain text file format that stores instrument data for software synthesizers. The SFZ format was developed by René Ceballos (founder of rgc:audio software) and continues to be used by companies such as Cakewalk, Plogue and Garritan. SFZ is a royalty-free format and can be used by software developers for both free and commercial purposes. The SFZ Format is widely accepted as an open standard to define the behavior of a musical instrument from a bare set of sound recordings.

Similar file formats are the open Decent Sampler format.dspreset and the proprietary format of Native Instruments Kontakt .nki, .nkm.

A simple example of an SFZ file:
<group>
lovel=0
hivel=127

<region> trigger=attack  pitch_keycenter=60 lokey=30 hikey=61 sample=SubDir/01C4.wav
<region> trigger=attack  pitch_keycenter=62 lokey=62 hikey=63 sample=SubDir/02D4.wav
<region> trigger=attack  pitch_keycenter=64 lokey=64 hikey=64 sample=SubDir/03E4.wav
<region> trigger=attack  pitch_keycenter=65 lokey=65 hikey=66 sample=SubDir/04F4.wav
<region> trigger=attack  pitch_keycenter=67 lokey=67 hikey=68 sample=SubDir/05G4.wav
<region> trigger=attack  pitch_keycenter=69 lokey=69 hikey=70 sample=SubDir/06A4.wav
<region> trigger=attack  pitch_keycenter=71 lokey=71 hikey=71 sample=SubDir/07B4.wav
<region> trigger=attack  pitch_keycenter=72 lokey=72 hikey=73 sample=SubDir/08C5.wav
<region> trigger=attack  pitch_keycenter=74 lokey=74 hikey=75 sample=SubDir/09D5.wav
<region> trigger=attack  pitch_keycenter=76 lokey=76 hikey=108 sample=SubDir/10E5.wav

The SFZ format isn't maintained by a single company or group, and supported features can vary between individual synthesizers. The official page at the Cakewalk web-site is no longer available, however descriptions of the SFZ opcodes can be found on various websites.

Applications exist that provide a point-and-click GUI for creating SFZ files, as an alternative to editing the text directly.

References

External links 
 Sfzformat
 Ariaengine
 SFZ opcodes list at LinuxSampler.org

Computer file formats